The Harbin Jewish Research Center is located in Harbin (China) and was founded in April 2000 by the Heilongjiang Academy of Social Sciences.

In 2003, the history and culture of the Jews of Harbin was approved as a new branch of science study at a provincial level. Its major research areas cover the following aspects: development and use of the relics and sites of Harbin, promoting the process of reform and opening up of Heilongjiang and attracting foreign funds.

In 2009 a cooperation with the Austrian Holocaust Memorial Service is planned.

Efforts of the Center 
2002: scale picture exhibition of Jews in Harbin was held
2003: June, Remaining Jewish Sites in Harbin postcards
2004: September, Jews in Harbin was published

References

History of Harbin
Jewish history organizations
Jews and Judaism in Harbin
Religion in Heilongjiang
Organizations based in Harbin
2000 establishments in China
Research institutes established in 2000
Research institutes in China